A dynamite roll is a type of Western-style sushi. It usually contains a piece of prawn tempura and masago (capelin roe), with vegetables like radish sprouts, avocado and/or cucumber, as well as Japanese mayonnaise. In another variant, hamachi (yellowtail) replaces prawn tempura.

American fusion cuisine
Sushi in the United States